The 2021–22 season was the 142nd competitive association football season in England.

National teams

England men's national football team

Results and fixtures

Friendlies

FIFA World Cup qualification

UEFA Group I

UEFA Euro 2020

Knockout phase

Final

UEFA Nations League

Group 3

England women's national football team

Results and fixtures

Friendlies

2023 FIFA Women's World Cup qualification

Group D

2022 Arnold Clark Cup

UEFA competitions

UEFA Super Cup

UEFA Champions League

Group stage

Group A

Group B

Group F

Group H

Knockout phase

Round of 16

|}

Quarter-finals

|}

Semi-finals

|}

Final

UEFA Europa League

Group stage

Group C

Group H

Knockout stage

Round of 16

|}

Quarter-finals

|}

Semi-finals

|}

UEFA Europa Conference League

Qualifying phase and play-off round

Play-off round

|}

Group stage

Group G

Knockout stage

Knockout round play-offs

|}

Round of 16

|}

Quarter-finals

|}

Semi-finals

|}

UEFA Youth League

UEFA Champions League Path

Group stage

Group A

Group B

Group F

Group H

Play-offs

Knockout round play-offs

|}

Round of 16

|}

Quarter-finals

|}

UEFA Women's Champions League

Qualifying rounds

Round 1

Semi-finals

|}

Final

|}

Round 2

|}

Group stage

Group A

Group C

Knockout phase

Quarter-finals

|}

Men's football

Premier League

Having looked all but sewn up at the start of 2022, the title race ended up going to the final day of the season, with Liverpool and Manchester City once again battling it out – a battle that City once again came out on top of in thanks in part to a superb run of form in the closing weeks and despite a very late scare on the final day, securing manager Pep Guardiola his fourth Premier League title in six seasons. Despite falling short in their hunt for a second top-flight title since 1990, ending hopes of an unprecedented quadruple, Liverpool nevertheless managed to end the season with trophy success, winning both the League Cup and the FA Cup on penalties, whilst going unbeaten in the league at Anfield for the fourth time in five seasons, reaching their third Champions League final in five seasons (narrowly losing to Real Madrid) becoming the first English team to reach the final of the Champions League and the domestic cup competitions in the same season.

Having also been in the title race at Christmas, Chelsea only secured a top-four spot in the closing week of the campaign, whilst also finishing the season empty-handed, including a third FA Cup final loss in three years (also losing the League Cup final to Liverpool), as their season quickly unravelled amid off-field troubles caused by sanctions being placed against owner Roman Abramovich in the aftermath of Russia's invasion of Ukraine, forcing Abramovich to put the club up for sale. North London rivals Arsenal and Tottenham Hotspur ended up battling it out to secure fourth place; in the end, Tottenham emerged victorious in spite of a dreadful start to the season under former Wolves manager Nuno Espirito Santo, with the appointment of former Chelsea manager Antonio Conte ultimately proving to be an inspired choice – as a result, despite recovering from their worst ever start to a Premier League season to achieve a return to European football, Arsenal could only manage fifth place as a result of several big losses in the new year.

Despite making an overall good start, Manchester United endured arguably their worst season since the retirement of Alex Ferguson, enduring early exits in both domestic cups and several big losses in the league, including losing 5–0 at home to bitter rivals Liverpool (and then 4–0 at Anfield in the return game) and 4–1 at promoted Watford, the latter game ultimately resulting in the sacking of manager Ole Gunnar Solskjær – and despite the appointment of Ralf Rangnick on an interim basis and the goals of returning striker Cristiano Ronaldo keeping them in the Champions League race, an equally poor end to the season saw the Red Devils finish sixth and with their lowest Premier League points total, only barely ensuring a Europa League spot. Newcastle United had what proved to be an eventful season both on and off the pitch, a very poor start to the season being offset by the takeover of the club by the Public Investment Fund after years of protest and anger against controversial owner Mike Ashley – and whilst the threat of relegation still lingered over the Magpies in the New Year, the appointment of new head coach Eddie Howe and a number of shrewd January signings helped the club rocket up the table and comfortably into mid-table.

Despite picking up fewer wins than the previous year and seeing a number of first-team players depart in the summer, Crystal Palace had an impressive first season under the management of Arsenal legend Patrick Vieira, the Eagles hitting the ground running with a more attacking style of football and with the end results being quite successful, the club never once looking like being in a relegation battle on top of reaching the FA Cup semi-finals, finishing with a positive goal difference and taking four points off Manchester City in the league. Brentford enjoyed what proved to be a rollercoaster campaign in their first top flight season in 74 years, first making a superb start before both results and points dried up – but the January signing of midfielder Christian Eriksen, itself a remarkable comeback for the Dane following his cardiac arrest the previous summer, proved to be a big turning point for their season, the Bees picking up a number of wins (including their first away win against Chelsea in 83 years) in the closing months to ensure a second successive season in the Premier League, a fantastic achievement for the London club.

Having won automatic promotion the previous season, both Norwich City and Watford endured an immediate return to the Championship – the tone for the Canaries' season being set by an opening run of six straight losses, with even the surprise decision to replace promotion-winning manager Daniel Farke with Dean Smith after eleven games failing to give the Norfolk club much in terms of inspiration; likewise for Watford, despite a reasonable start that included a 4–1 home victory over Manchester United in November, the Hornets simply never got to grips with the fast pace of the top-flight, making it through three different managers across the season and breaking a number of unwanted records for their form at Vicarage Road, including consecutive home losses and number of home losses as well as failing to keep a clean sheet until May. Taking the final relegation place, after weeks of twists and turns, were Burnley, the Clarets falling into the relegation zone in the closing minutes of the season; despite a late upturn in form following the controversial sacking of long-serving manager Sean Dyche, a late collapse that saw them gain just one point from their last four games proved fatal. Leeds United finished just above them, the equally controversial decision to sack promotion-winning manager Marcelo Bielsa in favour of Jesse Marsch proving to give the Yorkshire club just enough to avoid the drop, in spite of an atrocious defensive record - whilst Everton overcame one of their worst league seasons, including securing their joint-worst points tally for a league campaign in their history and recording just three wins in 23 between the start of October and early April, to finish in 16th.

Championship 

Despite a few shaky spells of form across the season, Fulham secured promotion back to the Premier League as champions – their third in five years and their second consecutive immediate return – the London club never looking like falling out of the top six all season, becoming the first second-tier team in twenty years to score over 100 goals in a season and with star striker Aleksandar Mitrovic scoring an unprecedented 43 of those, a new record for the second tier. Taking the second automatic promotion spot were Bournemouth, who put both their play-off disappointment the previous year and an inconsistent run of form over the winter months behind them to return to the top-flight after two years and earning manager Scott Parker his second promotion in three seasons (having ironically moved to the club from Fulham). In one of the biggest turnarounds of the season, Nottingham Forest took the final spot through the play-offs – having looked like facing relegation early in the season with one point from their first seven games, the appointment of former Swansea and England youth manager Steve Cooper saw the East Midlands club rocket up the table and solidify themselves in the top six after the March international break, before squeezing through the play-offs and ending a 23-year exile from the top-flight with victory over Huddersfield Town.

At the bottom of the table, owing to a points deduction being imposed on Reading for breaching financial rules, the Royals ended up enduring yet another relegation battle, albeit one that they managed to win at the expense of Barnsley, Derby County and Peterborough United – Barnsley enduring a horrendous opening half of the season and falling back into League One after three years, with even their usual late rally proving to be not enough to stave off the drop as the Tykes never quite recovered from the loss of manager Valérien Ismaël to West Bromwich Albion before the season started. Just one year after pulling off a narrow escape from relegation and in spite of some big results across the campaign, the points deductions imposed on Derby early in the season (12 for entering administration and 9 for financial irregularities) proved to be too much for the Rams to overcome, consigning the club to the third tier for the first time since 1986 – with even attempts to find new owners during the season almost ending in disaster, with a planned takeover falling through in June, before an ultimately successful takeover on the eve of the following season. Despite a late rally, Peterborough United endured immediate relegation back to League One, never really looking like escaping the drop in spite of both a decent run of wins in the early months of the season as well as the late return of former manager Grant McCann.

League One 

The battle to finish in the top six ended up going to the last day of the season, owing to a big drop in form for frontrunners Rotherham United and the teams in and around the play-off places picking up points – but Wigan Athletic ultimately emerged as champions, putting the uncertainties of the previous year behind them and securing their third promotion to the Championship since 2016. Rotherham ultimately finished in second, a late good run of form propelling the Millers back into the second tier and ensuring their third immediate promotion from League One in five years, as well as the sixth consecutive season in which they moved between the Championship and League One. Taking the final promotion spot with a convincing play-off final win against Wycombe Wanderers were Sunderland, the Black Cats overcoming the surprise sacking of manager Lee Johnson at the end of January and some poor away form in the campaign to secure their first promotion in 15 years - with the equally surprising decision to appoint former Norwich City manager Alex Neil as head coach proving to be a successful one.

Just two seasons after having been promoted, Crewe Alexandra endured a truly awful campaign that saw them become the first team in the Football League to be relegated, never once leaving the relegation zone after only their second game and enduring several heavy losses. The remaining three relegation places ended up being decided on the last day, AFC Wimbledon enduring their first ever relegation and falling back into League Two after six years – a miserable run of form that saw them fail to win any games after Christmas Day ultimately proving fatal for the Dons. Despite being among the pre-season promotion favourites, Doncaster Rovers finished just above them, having also fallen into the relegation zone after only their second game and never really looking like pulling off a great escape – though a few big wins in the closing weeks of the campaign ensured that the Yorkshire club managed to starve off relegation. Taking the final place in a tightly contested battle were Gillingham, who looked like having turned a corner following the sacking of manager Steve Evans, only for the teams above them to pick up form in the closing weeks and send the Gills down for the first time in nine years; escaping the drop as a result were Fleetwood and Morecambe, who overcame the worst defensive record in the season to ensure a successful first campaign in League One.

League Two 

After consecutive campaigns of near-misses and heartbreak, Forest Green Rovers marked both five years in the Football League and Rob Edwards' first season as head coach with their first ever promotion to League One, going up as champions on goal difference and not falling out of the top three once in the campaign, even with poor form in the New Year nearly making them lose out on top spot. Exeter City finished not far behind them, finally achieving promotion back to the third tier following years of play-off final losses, heartbreak and near-misses in manager Matt Taylor's fourth season as manager. Taking the third automatic promotion spot in extraordinary circumstances were Bristol Rovers, who managed an immediate return to the third tier by virtue of goals scored after a 7-0 victory in their final game, narrowly edging out Northampton Town despite having never been in the top three prior to the final day. Ending a five-year absence from the third tier by winning the play-offs were Port Vale - who overcame both a run of inconsistent form in the New Year and the absence of manager Darrell Clarke for nearly three months following the death of his daughter to secure fifth place and run out comfortable winners in the final.

Despite missing out on a play-off spot on the last day, Sutton United enjoyed a very successful maiden campaign in the Football League that included a narrow loss in the EFL Trophy final; having started slowly, the London club rocketed up the table, staying in and around the top seven from October onwards and with only a heavy home loss in their penultimate game going against the club. Having made a decent start on their return to the Football League, the departure of manager Dave Challinor to Stockport County saw Hartlepool United suffer a steep decline in form that saw them fall from the play-off places to mid-table; whilst the worse form of the teams below them ensured that the Pools never fell into the relegation battle, a disappointing 17th place was all the club could manage, a fair cry from their promotion chasing run early in the season.

After 72 years of Football League membership and just eleven years after having been in the Championship, Scunthorpe United's resilience finally gave out and they endured relegation to the National League, the Iron only escaping the drop zone once after their seventh game and securing just four wins across all competitions, as well as going down with statistically the worst playing record of any club relegated to the National League since Doncaster Rovers' infamously poor 1997–98 campaign. The battle to avoid the second spot proved to be tighter, with Barrow, Oldham Athletic and Stevenage fighting it out – but despite the return of manager John Sheridan for a fourth spell as Oldham manager, both Barrow and Stevenage achieved good runs of form in the closing months, enabling them to escape the drop and ending the Latics' 115-year run in the Football League (also resulting in them becoming the first former Premier League club to be relegated out of the Football League), the club not being helped by escalating fan anger towards owner Abdallah Lemsagam, including an on-field protest in the game that saw them relegated.

National League 

Having also looked all but sewn up at the end of March, the title race ended up going to the last day of the season – but nine years after having fallen into the sixth tier, Stockport County continued their climb back up the football pyramid, achieving promotion back into the Football League for the first time since 2011 – a fantastic run of form in 2022 propelling the Hatters from the playoff places to automatic promotion, winning the title comfortably. Taking the second promotion spot in one of the most extraordinary playoff campaigns in the fifth tier were Grimsby Town, the Mariners going to extra time in all of their playoff games and scoring late winners in each of them to secure an immediate return to the Football League.

At the bottom of the table, Dover Athletic endured inarguably the worst season in the history of the top five flights of English football, enduring a points deduction before the campaign started (for their failure to fulfil all their fixtures the previous year), finishing with just one point as a result and conceding 101 goals. Weymouth finished second from bottom, the Dorset club never quite looking like overcoming the loss of their promotion-winning manager two seasons prior, but at least prolonging their stay in the fifth tier until the closing weeks of the campaign – with King's Lynn Town finishing just above them in turn, the club enduring the relegation they had only avoided the previous year owing to there being no promotions or relegations between the National League tiers.

League play-offs

Football League play-offs

EFL Championship

Final

EFL League One

Final

EFL League Two

Final

National League play-offs

National League

Final

Cup Competitions

FA Cup

Final

EFL Cup

Final

Community Shield

EFL Trophy

Final

FA Trophy

Final

Women's football

FA Women's Super League

FA Women's Championship

FA Women's National League

Cup competitions

Women's FA Cup

2020–21 Women's FA Cup

Final

2021–22 Women's FA Cup

Final

FA Women's League Cup

Final

Women's FA Community Shield

Managerial changes 
This is a list of changes of managers within English league football:

Deaths
 3 June 2021: Alan Miller, 51, Arsenal, Middlesbrough, West Bromwich Albion and Blackburn Rovers goalkeeper
 6 June 2021: Paul Cahill, 65, Portsmouth, Tranmere Rovers and Stockport County defender
 8 June 2021: John Angus, 82, England and Burnley defender
 19 June 2021: Spencer Whelan, 49, Chester City and Shrewsbury Town defender
 25 June 2021: Mike Burgess, 89, Leyton Orient, Newport County, A.F.C. Bournemouth, Halifax Town and Gillingham defender
 29 June 2021: Jock Aird, 94, Scotland, New Zealand and Burnley defender
 9 July 2021: Paul Mariner, 68, England, Plymouth Argyle, Ipswich Town, Arsenal and Portsmouth forward, who also managed Plymouth Argyle
 10 July 2021: Jimmy Gabriel, 80, Scotland, Everton, Southampton, A.F.C. Bournemouth and Brentford midfielder
 11 July 2021: Ernie Moss, 71, Chesterfield, Peterborough United, Mansfield Town, Port Vale, Lincoln City, Doncaster Rovers, Stockport County and Scarborough forward
 12 July 2021: Mick Bates, 73, Leeds United, Walsall, Bradford City and Doncaster Rovers midfielder
 14 July 2021: Bobby Barr, 51, Halifax Town defender.
 16 July 2021: Keith Bambridge, 85, Rotherham United, Darlington and Halifax Town outside left
 17 July 2021: George Curtis, 82, Coventry City and Aston Villa defender, who also managed Coventry City
 18 July 2021: Jeff Barmby, 78, York City striker
 21 July 2021: Tommy Leishman, 83, Liverpool wing half
 21 July 2021: Ken Ronaldson, 75, Bristol Rovers and Gillingham winger.
 21 July 2021: Mike Smith, 83, Hull City manager
 23 July 2021: Andy Higgins, 61, Chesterfield, Port Vale, Hartlepool United, Rochdale and Chester City defender
 26 July 2021: Ally Dawson, 63, Scotland and Blackburn Rovers defender
 28 July 2021: Derek Tomkinson, 90, Port Vale and Macclesfield Town forward
 31 July 2021: Terry Cooper, 77, England, Leeds United, Middlesbrough, Bristol City, Bristol Rovers and Doncaster Rovers left back, who also managed Bristol Rovers, Bristol City, Exeter City and Birmingham City
 1 August 2021: Eddie Presland, 78, West Ham United and Crystal Palace defender
 7 August 2021: Robbie Cooke, 64, Mansfield Town, Peterborough United, Cambridge United, Brentford and Millwall forward
 18 August 2021: Gerry Jones, 75, Stoke City outside left
 21 August 2021: Arthur Smith , 106, Bury and Leicester City winger
 25 August 2021: Ray Aspden, 83, Rochdale defender
 25 August 2021: Bobby Waddell, 81, Blackpool and Bradford Park Avenue forward.
 27 August 2021: Peter McNamee, 86, Peterborough United and Notts County outside left.
 27 August 2021: Johnny Williamson, 92, Manchester City and Blackburn Rovers forward.
 28 August 2021: Sam Oji, 35, Birmingham City, Leyton Orient and Hereford United defender.
 1 September 2021: Sid Watson, 93, Mansfield Town wing half.
 c. 11 September 2021: Tom Anthony, 78, Brentford left back.
 17 September 2021: Tony Scott, 80, West Ham United, Aston Villa, Torquay United, A.F.C. Bournemouth and Exeter City winger.
 19 September 2021: Jimmy Greaves MBE, 81, England World Cup winner, Chelsea, Tottenham Hotspur and West Ham United striker.
 19 September 2021: Terry Long, 86, Crystal Palace defender.
 20 September 2021: Tony Toms, 76, Hartlepool United, Gillingham and Sheffield Wednesday trainer/coach.
 25 September 2021: Len Ashurst, 82, Sunderland and Hartlepool United defender, who also managed Hartlepool United, Gillingham, Sheffield Wednesday, Newport County, Cardiff City and Sunderland.
 27 September 2021: Martin Burleigh, 70, Newcastle United, Darlington, Carlisle United and Hartlepool United goalkeeper.
 27 September 2021: Roger Hunt , 83, England World Cup winner, Liverpool and Bolton Wanderers striker.
 28 September 2021: Alan Woods, 84, Tottenham Hotspur, Swansea City and York City wing half.
 29 September 2021: Ray Ruffett, 97, Luton Town wing half.
 1 October 2021: Freddie Hill, 81, England, Bolton Wanderers, Halifax Town, Manchester City and Peterborough United inside forward.
 1 October 2021: Paul Linger, 46, Charlton Athletic, Leyton Orient and Brighton & Hove Albion midfielder.
 1 October 2021: Brian Sherratt, 77, Stoke City, Oxford United, Barnsley and Colchester United goalkeeper.
 4 October 2021: Terry Eades, 77, Cambridge United defender.
 7 October 2021: Andy Porter, 84, Watford midfielder.
 16 October 2021: George Kinnell, 83, Stoke City, Oldham Athletic, Sunderland and Middlesbrough midfielder.
 26 October 2021: Walter Smith , 73, Everton manager and Manchester United assistant manager.
 30 October 2021: Billy Webb, 89, Leicester City and Stockport County left back.
 2 November 2021: Alf Patrick, 100, York City forward.
 5 November 2021: Bobby Bainbridge, 90, York City striker.
 6 November 2021: Jim Kerray, 85, Huddersfield Town and Newcastle United striker.
 7 November 2021: Barry Jackson, 83, York City defender and record appearance-maker.
 9 November 2021: Laurie Sheffield, 82, Newport County, Doncaster Rovers, Norwich City, Rotherham United, Oldham Athletic, Luton Town and Peterborough United forward.
 10 November 2021: Bill Calder, 87, Leicester City, Bury, Oxford United and Rochdale forward.
 12 November 2021: Ron Flowers , 87, England World Cup winner, Wolverhampton Wanderers and Northampton Town midfielder, who also managed Northampton Town.
 12 November 2021: Bertie Auld, 83, Scotland and Birmingham City outside left.
 13 November 2021: Louis Bimpson, 92, Liverpool, Blackburn Rovers, Bournemouth & Boscombe Athletic and Rochdale striker.
 18 November 2021: Joe Laidlaw, 71, Middlesbrough, Carlisle United, Doncaster Rovers, Portsmouth, Hereford United and Mansfield Town midfielder.
 21 November 2021: John Sewell, 85, Charlton Athletic, Crystal Palace and Leyton Orient defender.
 24 November 2021: Frank Burrows, 77, Scunthorpe United and Swindon Town defender, who also managed Portsmouth, Cardiff City and Swansea City.
 24 November 2021: Cliff Marshall, 66, Everton and Southport forward.
 c. 25 November 2021: Keith Morton, 87, Crystal Palace and Darlington forward.
 28 November 2021: Johnny Hills, 87, Tottenham Hotspur and Bristol Rovers full back.
 30 November 2021: Phil Dwyer, 68, Wales and Cardiff City defender.
 30 November 2021: Ray Kennedy, 70, England, Arsenal, Liverpool, Swansea City and Hartlepool United midfielder/forward.
 30 November 2021: John Sillett, 85, Chelsea, Coventry City and Plymouth Argyle full back, who also managed Hereford United and Coventry City.
 6 December 2021: Marvin Morgan, 38, Aldershot Town, Dagenham & Redbridge, Shrewsbury Town, Plymouth Argyle and Hartlepool United forward.
 14 December 2021: Jimmy Robson. 83, Burnley, Blackpool, Barnsley and Bury inside forward.
 c. 16 December 2021: John 'Dan' Archer, 80, Port Vale, Bournemouth & Boscombe Athletic, Crewe Alexandra and Chesterfield midfielder/inside forward.
 c. 17 December 2021: Trevor Thompson, 66, West Bromwich Albion, Newport County and Lincoln City full back.
 21 December 2021: Roy Sawyer, 81, Barnsley defender.
 29 December 2021: Steve Peplow, 72, Liverpool, Swindon Town, Nottingham Forest and Tranmere Rovers winger.
 7 January 2022: Jimmy Smith, 91, Chelsea and Leyton Orient winger.
 8 January 2022: Keith Todd, 80, Swansea Town forward.
 c. 10 January 2022: Glyn Jones, 85, Sheffield United, Rotherham United and Mansfield Town inside forward.
 c. 14 January 2022: Lol Morgan, 90, Huddersfield Town, Rotherham United and Darlington defender, who also managed Darlington and Norwich City.
 c. 15 January 2022: Paul Hinshelwood, 65, Crystal Palace, Oxford United, Millwall and Colchester United right back.
 17 January 2022: Jackie Fisher, 96, Millwall and AFC Bournemouth defender.
 18 January 2022: Jamie Vincent, 46, Crystal Palace, AFC Bournemouth, Huddersfield Town, Portsmouth, Derby County, Millwall, Swindon Town, Walsall and Aldershot Town defender.
 21 January 2022: Howard Radford, 91, Bristol Rovers goalkeeper.
 3 February 2022: Alex Ingram, 77, Nottingham Forest forward.
 4 February 2022: Steve Finney, 48, Preston North End, Swindon Town, Carlisle United, Leyton Orient and Chester City striker.
 c. 10 February 2022: Mick Newman, 89, West Ham United inside forward.
 13 February 2022: Andy Spring, 56, Coventry City and Bristol Rovers right back.
 14 February 2022: Geoff Barker, 73, Hull City, Darlington, Reading and Grimsby Town defender.
 17 February 2022: Steve Burtenshaw, 86, Brighton & Hove Albion wing half, who also managed Sheffield Wednesday and Queens Park Rangers.
 18 February 2022: Billy McEwan, 70, Blackpool, Brighton & Hove Albion, Chesterfield, Mansfield Town, Peterborough United and Rotherham United midfielder, who also managed Sheffield United, Rotherham United and Darlington
 18 February 2022: Trevor Swift, 73, Rotherham United defender.
 19 February 2022: Doug Baillie, 85, Swindon Town defender.
 19 February 2022: Joey Beauchamp, 50, Oxford United and Swindon Town midfielder.
 27 February 2022: Alan Anderson, 82, Scotland, Millwall and Scunthorpe United defender.
 6 March 2022: Frank O'Farrell, 94, Republic of Ireland, West Ham United and Preston North End wing half, who also managed Torquay United, Leicester City, Manchester United and Cardiff City.
 8 March 2022: Gordon Lee, 87, Aston Villa and Shrewsbury Town defender, who managed Port Vale, Blackburn Rovers, Newcastle United, Everton, Preston North End and Leicester City.
 15 March 2022: Tom Barnett, 85, Crystal Palace winger.
 16 March 2022: Tony Marchi, 89, Tottenham Hotspur wing half, who also managed Northampton Town.
 18 March 2022: Andy Lochhead, 81, Burnley, Leicester City, Aston Villa and Oldham Athletic striker.
 c. 22 March 2022: Bill Shipwright, 89, Watford and Aldershot defender.
 23 March 2022: Terry Darracott, 71, Everton and Wrexham full back.
 c. 24 March 2022: Ivan Hollett, 81, Mansfield Town, Chesterfield, Crewe Alexandra, Cambridge United and Hereford United striker.
 March 2022: Alan Wooler, 68, West Ham United and Aldershot defender.
 29 March 2022: Ansah Owusu, 42, Wimbledon and Bristol Rovers midfielder.
 31 March 2022: Bob Todd, 72, Rotherham United, Mansfield Town and Workington winger.
 5 April 2022: Edward Rayner, 89, Stoke City midfielder.
 c. 14 April 2022: Con Sullivan, 93, Bristol City and Arsenal goalkeeper.
 17 April 2022: Jimmy Harris, 88, Everton, Birmingham City and Oldham Athletic forward.
 20 April 2022: Harold Wilcockson, 78, Rotherham United, Doncaster Rovers and Sheffield Wednesday defender.
 c. 21 April 2022: Bernard Fisher, 88, Hull City and Bradford City goalkeeper.
 24 April 2022: Freddy Hall, 37, Bermuda and Northampton Town goalkeeper.
 30 April 2022: Neil Campbell, 45, York City, Scarborough and Southend United striker.
 8 May 2022: Syd Farrimond, 81, Bolton Wanderers and Tranmere Rovers defender.
 15 May 2022: Mark Davies, 49, Swansea City defender.
 18 May 2022: Brian Bedford, 88, Reading, Southampton, AFC Bournemouth, Queens Park Rangers, Scunthorpe United and Brentford forward.
 26 May 2022: Neil O'Donnell, 72, Norwich City, Gillingham and Sheffield Wednesday midfielder.
 26 May 2022: Jimmy Whitehouse, 87, Reading, Coventry City and Millwall forward.
 30 May 2022: Craig Farrell, 39, Carlisle United forward.

Retirements
 1 June 2021: Rene Gilmartin, 34, former Walsall , Watford, Plymouth Argyle and Colchester United goalkeeper.
 2 June 2021: Mark Milligan, 35, former Australia and Southend United midfielder
 3 June 2021: Nicklas Bendtner, 33, former Denmark, Arsenal and Nottingham Forest forward
 3 June 2021: Steven Whittaker, 36, former Scotland and Norwich City defender
 12 June 2021: Carl Tremarco, 35, former Tranmere Rovers, Wrexham and Macclesfield Town defender
 28 June 2021: David Gray, 33, former Manchester United, Crewe Alexandra, Plymouth Argyle, Preston North End, Stevenage and Burton Albion defender
 28 June 2021: Tony McMahon, 35, former Middlesbrough, Sheffield United, Blackpool, Bradford City and Oxford United right back.
 2 July 2021: Sam Hird, 33, former Doncaster Rovers, Chesterfield and Barrow defender
 15 July 2021: Arjen Robben, 37, former Netherlands and Chelsea winger.
 20 July 2021: Joe Riley, 29, former Bolton Wanderers, Oxford United, Bury, Shrewsbury Town, Plymouth Argyle, and Mansfield Town defender
 30 July 2021: Scott Brown, 36, former Bristol City, Cheltenham Town, Port Vale, Morecambe and Accrington Stanley midfielder
 30 July 2021: Nathan Dyer, 33, former Southampton and Swansea City winger
 2 August 2021: Stewart Downing, 37, former England, Middlesbrough, Aston Villa, Liverpool, West Ham United and Blackburn Rovers midfielder
 8 August 2021: Jose Baxter, 29, former Everton, Tranmere Rovers, Oldham Athletic, Sheffield United, and Plymouth Argyle midfielder
 16 August 2021: Tommie Hoban, 27, former Watford defender
 30 August 2021: Billy Clarke, 33, former Ipswich Town, Blackpool, Crawley Town, Bradford City, Charlton Athletic, Plymouth Argyle and Grimsby Town striker.
 1 September 2021: Shaun MacDonald, 33, former Wales, Swansea City, A.F.C. Bournemouth, Wigan Athletic, Rotherham United and Crewe Alexandra midfielder.
 1 September 2021: Kingsley James, 29, former Sheffield United, Port Vale, Chasetown, Hereford United, Chester, FC Halifax Town, Macclesfield Town, Barrow, Guiseley, Gainsborough Trinity, Hyde United, Farsley Celtic, and England C midfielder
 13 September 2021: Demba Ba, 36, former Senegal, West Ham United, Newcastle United and Chelsea striker.
 14 September 2021: Grant Leadbitter, 35, former Sunderland, Ipswich Town and Middlesbrough midfielder.
 17 September 2021: Jack Hobbs, 33, former Lincoln City, Liverpool, Scunthorpe United, Leicester City, Hull City, Nottingham Forest, and Bolton Wanderers defender
 18 September 2021: Kári Árnason, 38, Iceland, Plymouth Argyle and Rotherham United defender.
 26 September 2021: Samir Nasri, 34, former France, Arsenal, Manchester City and West Ham United midfielder.
 28 September 2021: Steven Taylor, 35, former Newcastle United, Wycombe Wanderers, Ipswich Town and Peterborough United defender.
 11 October 2021: Wayne Routledge, 36, former Crystal Palace, Tottenham Hotspur, Aston Villa, Queens Park Rangers, Newcastle United and Swansea City midfielder.
 15 October 2021: Simon Cox, 34, former Republic of Ireland, Reading, Swindon Town, West Bromwich Albion, Nottingham Forest and Southend United striker.
 23 October 2021: Adam Federici, 36, former Australia, Reading, Southend United, Bournemouth and Stoke City goalkeeper.
 28 October 2021: George Boyd, 36, former Scotland, Peterborough United, Hull City, Burnley, Sheffield Wednesday and Salford City midfielder.
 2 November 2021: Luke Varney, 39, former Crewe Alexandra, Charlton Athletic, Derby County, Portsmouth, Leeds United, Blackburn Rovers, Ipswich Town, Burton Albion and Cheltenham Town forward.
 12 November 2021: Yuki Abe, 40, former Japan and Leicester City midfielder.
 12 November 2021: Joe Ledley, 34, former Wales, Cardiff City, Crystal Palace, Derby County, Charlton Athletic and Newport County midfielder.
 16 November 2021: Jonás Gutiérrez, 38, former Argentina and Newcastle United midfielder.
 24 November 2021: David Templeton, 32, former Burton Albion winger.
 27 November 2021: Maxi Rodríguez, 40, former Argentina and Liverpool midfielder.
 4 December 2021: Filipe Morais, 36, former Chelsea, Milton Keynes Dons, Millwall, Oldham Athletic, Stevenage, Bradford City, Bolton Wanderers, Crawley Town, Oldham Athletic, and Grimsby Town midfielder
 14 December 2021: Collin Quaner, 30, former Huddersfield Town forward.
 15 December 2021: Sergio Agüero, 33, former Argentina and Manchester City striker.
 19 December 2021: Adam Collin, 37, former Carlisle United, Rotherham United and Notts County goalkeeper.
 22 December 2021: David Raven, 36, former Liverpool, Carlisle United, Shrewsbury Town and Tranmere Rovers defender.
 29 December 2021: Fabricio Coloccini, 39, former Argentina and Newcastle United defender.
 1 January 2022: Sam McQueen, 26, former Southampton left back.
 4 January 2022: Davy Pröpper, 30, former Netherlands and Brighton & Hove Albion midfielder.
 4 January 2022: Alan Sheehan, 35, former Leicester City, Mansfield Town, Leeds United, Crewe Alexandra, Oldham Athletic, Swindon Town, Notts County, Bradford City, Peterborough United, Luton Town, Northampton Town and Lincoln City defender
 5 January 2022: Scott Davies, 34, former Morecambe, Fleetwood Town and Tranmere Rovers goalkeeper.
 6 January 2022: Mark Hughes, 35, former Everton, Stockport County, Northampton Town, Walsall, Bury, Accrington Stanley, Stevenage and Bristol Rovers defender
 10 January 2022: Matt Gilks, 39, former Scotland, Blackpool, Burnley, Norwich City, Rochdale, Wigan Athletic, Shrewsbury Town, Scunthorpe United, Lincoln City, Fleetwood Town and Bolton Wanderers goalkeeper.
 11 January 2022: Ryan Shawcross, 34, former England, Manchester United and Stoke City defender
 25 January 2022: Gary Dicker, 35, former Stockport County, Brighton & Hove Albion, Rochdale, Crawley Town and Carlisle United midfielder.
 2 February 2022: Matt Bloomfield, 37, former Ipswich Town and Wycombe Wanderers midfielder.
 19 February 2022: Alejandro Faurlín, 35, former Queens Park Rangers midfielder
 8 March 2022: Bradley Wright-Phillips, 36, former Manchester City, Southampton, Plymouth Argyle and Charlton Athletic striker.
 20 March 2022: Tristan Nydam, 22, former Ipswich Town midfielder/defender.
 24 March 2022: Jermain Defoe , 39, former England, West Ham United, Tottenham Hotspur, Portsmouth, Sunderland and AFC Bournemouth striker.
 26 March 2022: Laurent Koscielny, 36, former France and Arsenal defender.
 31 March 2022: Declan Rudd, 31, former Norwich City, Charlton Athletic and Preston North End goalkeeper.
 14 April 2022: Conor McLaughlin, 30, former Northern Ireland, Preston North End, Fleetwood Town, Millwall and Sunderland right back.
 22 April 2022: Stephen Ward, 36, former Republic of Ireland, Wolverhampton Wanderers, Burnley, Stoke City, Ipswich Town and Walsall left back.
 30 April 2022: Andy Keogh, 35, former Republic of Ireland, Leeds United, Bury, Scunthorpe United, Wolverhampton Wanderers, Cardiff City, Bristol City, Millwall and Blackpool striker.
 3 May 2022: George Elokobi, 37, former Colchester United, Chester City, Wolverhampton Wanderers, Nottingham Forest, Bristol City and Oldham Athletic defender.
 3 May 2022: Luke McCormick, 38, former Plymouth Argyle, Oxford United and Swindon Town goalkeeper.
 7 May 2022: Danny Livesey, 37, former Bolton Wanderers, Notts County, Rochdale, Blackpool and Carlisle United defender.
8 May 2022: Marko Marin, 33, former Germany and Chelsea midfielder.
 11 May 2022: Mat Sadler, 37, former Birmingham City, Watford, Walsall, Crawley Town, Rotherham United and Shrewsbury Town defender.
 16 May 2022: Scott Vernon, 38, former Oldham Athletic, Blackpool, Colchester United, Shrewsbury Town and Grimsby Town striker.
 17 May 2022: Martin Škrtel, 37,  former Slovakia and Liverpool defender.
 17 May 2022: Mark Carrington, 35, former Crewe Alexandra, Milton Keynes Dons and Bury midfielder.
 20 May 2022: Joseph Mills, 32, former Southampton, Reading, Burnley, Oldham Athletic, Forest Green Rovers and Northampton Town defender.
 21 May 2022: Adebayo Akinfenwa, 38, former Boston United, Leyton Orient, Doncaster Rovers, Torquay United, Swansea City, Millwall, Northampton Town, Gillingham, A.F.C. Wimbledon and Wycombe Wanderers striker.
 22 May 2022: Mark Noble, 34, former West Ham United midfielder.
 25 May 2022: Stephen Dobbie, 39, former Swansea City, Blackpool, Brighton & Hove Albion, Crystal Palace and Bolton Wanderers forward.
 26 May 2022: Lee Grant, 39, former Derby County, Sheffield Wednesday, Burnley, Stoke City and Manchester United goalkeeper.
 27 May 2022: Paul McShane, 36, former Republic of Ireland, West Bromwich Albion, Sunderland, Hull City, Reading and Rochdale defender.

Diary of the season
 31 August 2021: The first month of the season ends with Tottenham Hotspur top of the Premier League as the only team with a 100% start to the season. Closely behind are five teams on seven points: West Ham United, Manchester United, Chelsea, Liverpool and Everton, occupying second to sixth, followed by defending champions Manchester City in seventh. Wolverhampton Wanderers, Norwich City and Arsenal have lost each of their opening three games and occupy the relegation places. In the Championship, two of the recently relegated clubs, Fulham and West Bromwich Albion, occupy the top two, with Queens Park Rangers, Huddersfield Town, Stoke City and Bournemouth in the playoff places. The third newly relegated club, Sheffield United, is in the relegation zone, sandwiched by Nottingham Forest and newly promoted Blackpool.
 30 September 2021: September ends with Liverpool top of the Premier League as the only team unbeaten in their first six games. Five teams, Manchester City, Chelsea, Manchester United, Everton and Brighton, are all one point behind and occupy second to sixth, with West Ham United a further two points behind in seventh. Norwich, still without a point so far, sits at the bottom of the table, joined in the relegation zone by Burnley and Leeds United, with Newcastle United just outside the bottom three on goal difference. West Brom lead the Championship ahead of Bournemouth on goal difference, with Fulham, Coventry City, Stoke City and Blackburn Rovers occupying the playoff places. Huddersfield Town are just outside the playoff places on goal difference. After a 12-point deduction, Derby County sit bottom of the Championship, with Peterborough United and Hull City just above them in the bottom three.
 31 October 2021: At the quarter-way mark of the Premier League campaign, Chelsea sit top of the table, three points clear of Liverpool, who are one of two unbeaten teams in the top four divisions so far. Manchester City and West Ham are joint third, and Manchester United, Arsenal, and Brighton complete the top seven. At the other end of the table are the two teams in the Football League yet to experience victory, Norwich (20th) and Newcastle, newly flush with cash from their takeover by Saudi Arabia's PIF fund but yet to make any major moves beyond the mutual termination of head coach Steve Bruce's contract. Burnley are 18th, three points behind Aston Villa, Leeds, and Watford. Bournemouth - the second of the aforementioned unbeaten teams - lead the Championship with a five-point gap between them and Fulham. Fulham in turn have a four-point gap between them and third-placed West Brom. Coventy, Huddersfield and Blackpool lead a congested play-off chase. Derby County remain bottom of the Championship, with Barnsley now joining them and Hull in the bottom three.
 30 November 2021: November closes with Chelsea still leading the Premier League, a point ahead of Manchester City and two points ahead of Liverpool. West Ham hold the final Champions League spot, ahead of Arsenal on goal difference. Wolves and Spurs (who have a game in hand) round out the top seven. Norwich have managed to end their winless streak and are now only three points adrift of 17th-placed Watford, though there is no such luck for Newcastle, now bottom of the Premier League; Burnley also remain in the relegation zone. Fulham have leapfrogged Bournemouth at the Championship summit, but the Cherries have extended their distance from third place - currently held by QPR - to seven points. West Brom, Blackburn, and Coventry finish November in the top six. A further 12-point deduction sees Derby finish November on 1 point, with a daunting 19-point gap between them and 21st-placed Reading, struck themselves with a deduction of six points. Barnsley remain stuck in the bottom three, while Peterborough take Hull's place in the bottom three.
 31 December 2021: Manchester City enter 2022 with an eight point lead at the top of the Premier League table over second-placed Chelsea. Liverpool are third with a game in hand. Arsenal hold the coveted fourth spot, four points ahead of West Ham, though Manchester United and Spurs have at least one game in hand over Arsenal. Norwich finish the year back on the bottom of the Premier League, a point behind Newcastle and Burnley, though Burnley have games in hand over fellow strugglers Leeds and Watford. In the Championship, Bournemouth have returned to the top of the table, four points clear of joint-second Fulham and Blackburn. West Brom, Middlesbrough and Huddersfield finish December in the top six, but with only 12 points between 6th and 18th, plus multiple teams holding games in hand over the top six due to postponements, competition remains fierce. A return of nine points from a possible 12 in December has seen bottom club Derby County narrow the gap between them and 21st (still held by Reading) to 11 points, giving the East Midlands battlers an outside chance of avoiding the drop. Barnsley (23rd) and Peterborough also remain in the relegation zone.
 31 January 2022: Manchester City extend their Premier League lead to nine points at the end of January, although second-placed Liverpool still have a game in hand. Chelsea have dropped to third, and Manchester United have seized fourth place ahead of West Ham, Arsenal, and Spurs, though the latter two have at least one game in hand over United. Norwich have climbed out of the relegation zone at the expense of Watford, now sandwiched between Newcastle (18th) and Burnley, though with their rivals all having at least one game in hand (including four for Burnley alone) the relegation battle is only just beginning to intensify. In the Championship, Fulham have seized the lead following a stunning month that has seen them score 23 goals in only five matches and now lead second-placed Blackburn by five points, although Bournemouth and QPR could leapfrog the Lancastrians by winning their respective games in hand. West Brom and Middlesbrough remain in the top six, ahead of Huddersfield on goal difference. The Championship bottom four remains unchanged except for Derby and Barnsley swapping position, with only seven points now separating Derby and Reading.
 28 February 2022: February ends with Manchester City's lead cut to six points, with second-placed Liverpool still having a game in hand. Chelsea, despite only playing once in February due to their cup obligations, remain third with a three-point gap and two games in hand over Manchester United. West Ham and Arsenal are two points behind Manchester United, the latter with three games in hand over their top four rivals, with Spurs rounding out the top seven again. Norwich have returned to the bottom of the table, five points adrift of 17th-placed Everton having played two games more. Watford and Burnley remain in the relegation zone, though Newcastle, Brentford, and Leeds are also still in the mix. Fulham lead second-placed Bournemouth by nine points in the Championship, though the south coast side have two games in hand over the free-scoring Londoners. Huddersfield have usurped Blackburn to take third, QPR climb to fifth, and Luton finish February in sixth, with Sheffield United, Middlesbrough, Nottingham Forest, Coventry, and Millwall still in play-off contention. At the other end of the table, time is starting to run out for Derby, with only 12 games left to make up an eight-point deficit between them and 21st-placed Reading. As it stands Barnsley (in 22nd) look more likely to escape the bottom three, standing six points behind Reading with a game in hand. Peterborough are now bottom.
 31 March 2022: With less than a quarter of the Premier League left to play, Manchester City's lead over Liverpool in the title race has been reduced to one point, with the Merseysiders still to play at the Etihad Stadium. Chelsea remain third, having won all three games in a turbulent month that saw owner Roman Abramovich's assets - including Chelsea - frozen, and two sponsors terminate their sponsorship agreements with the club. Arsenal have moved to fourth, three points ahead of arch-rivals Spurs with a game in hand. Manchester United and West Ham complete the top seven. The relegation zone remains unchanged. In the Championship, Fulham find themselves needing only 10 points from their final nine games to confirm an immediate return to the Premier League. Bournemouth have narrowed the gap to Fulham to eight points, though they only have one game in hand now. A good month sees Luton - relegated from the old First Division the year before its rebranding as the Premier League - rise to third, and seeking to be the first club to be promoted all the way from non-league to the top flight of English football. Huddersfield are fourth on goal difference, Sheffield United have risen to fifth, while Blackburn's promotion push continues to falter as they end March in sixth. It remains anyone's guess as to who will claim the playoff places, with only 12 points separating Luton and Preston North End (14th). Derby County drop to the bottom of the table, still eight points behind Reading (21st). Barnsley and Peterborough remain in the bottom three.
 30 April 2022: Manchester City enter the final stretch of the Premier League season still a point ahead of Liverpool. Chelsea have all but secured third, being six points clear of fourth-placed Arsenal with five games left to play. Arsenal are two points clear of fifth-placed Spurs with the North London derby still to be played at Tottenham Hotspur Stadium. Manchester United's top four hopes are all but over with three games left for them to make up four points to Arsenal; seven-placed West Ham, for their part, still have a chance at Champions League qualification via the Europa League. A resurgence under caretaker Mike Jackson has seen Burnley climb to 16th, ahead of Leeds on goal difference and with five points between them and Everton in 18th. Everton's last hope is their extra two games in hand over Burnley; there is no such luck for Norwich, who have confirmed a sixth Premier League relegation, and Watford, who will be relegated if they fail to win another match or if Burnley and Leeds each earn one more point. Another so-called "yo-yo club", Fulham, have secured another promotion from the Championship and need one more point to confirm the league title. Bournemouth remain second with two games left, though one of those is against third-placed Nottingham Forest, who are just three points behind the south coast side. Fourth-placed Huddersfield have also confirmed their playoff spot. Luton Town and Sheffield United hold pole position for the other two playoff spots as the final matchday approaches, though Middlesbrough and Millwall can still claim spots if results go their way. Derby, Peterborough, and Barnsley have all confirmed relegation.

New clubs
Macclesfield F.C.

Clubs removed

Notes

References

 
2021 sport-related lists
2022 sport-related lists